In Greek mythology, Lynceus was a king of Argos, succeeding Danaus on the throne.

Family 
Lynceus was named as a descendant of Belus through his father Aegyptus, who was the twin brother of Danaus, father of fifty daughters called Danaïdes. He had forty-nine siblings and out of them had five full brothers namely Proteus, Busiris, Enceladus Lycus and Daiphron through their mother Argyphia, a woman of royal blood. By Hypermnestra, Lynceus became the father of Abas, who succeeded him as king.

Mythology 
Lynceus's father Aegyptus commanded that his sons should marry the Danaïdes but Danaus together with his daughters fled to Argos where King Pelasgus ruled. Then Lynceus together with his brothers and father arrived to take the Danaïdes. Danaus gave them to spare the Argives the pain of a battle.  However, he instructed his daughters to kill their husbands on their wedding night. Forty-nine followed through, but one, Hypermnestra refused because Lynceus honored her wish to remain a virgin. Danaus was angry with his disobedient daughter and threw her to the Argive courts but Aphrodite intervened and saved her. Lynceus later killed Danaus as revenge for the death of his brothers. Lynceus and Hypermnestra then began a dynasty of Argive kings (the Danaid Dynasty) beginning with Abas. In some versions of the legend, the Danaïdes, minus Hypermnestra (or sometimes alternately Amymone) were punished in Tartarus by being forced to carry water through a jug with holes, or a sieve, so the water always leaked out.

Argive genealogy in Greek mythology

See also
City of Lyrceia

References

Kings of Argos
Sons of Aegyptus

cs:Lynkeus#Lynkeus - syn Aigyptův